Dniester Hills, also known as Northern Moldavian Plateau is a geographic area that comprises most of the northern Moldova, and parts of the Chernivtsi Oblast of Ukraine. Dniester Hills are the N and NE component of the Moldavian Plateau. 

Dniester Hills run and ridge along the Dniester River, from the Colachin river, an affluent of the Prut river, and the Plonini Forest to the point where Dniester receives its tributary Răut. The river Dniester in turn bounds Dniester Hills to the N and E, and separates them from the Podolian Plateau. Dniester Hills are separated from the rest of the Moldavian Plateau (Suceava Plateau, Jijia Plain, Bălți steppe, Central Moldavian Plateau) by the passages formed in the valley of the Răut River and its tributaries, and partly by those of the Prut River and its tributaries. 

Dniester Hills have elevations of cca. 300 m. They are composed of:
 Hotin Plateau in the NW edge/alongation, containing the Plonini Forest, the Hotin Forest, as well as the Şipeniţ Valley
 Dniester Ridge, or Dniester Hillock, also called Dniester-Răut Ridge or "the Ridge between the Dniester and the Răut",, 2,480 km2, in the SE edge/alongation
 Northern Moldavian Hills, or Northern Bessarabian Plateau (Platoul Basarabiei de Nord), the central part of the Dniester Hills, 4,630 km2.

Due to the phenomenon of ridges along the right side bank of the river Dniester, the waters falling directly in the Dniester are only several small creeks. The NW part of the Dniester Hills, is characterized by numerous creeks sourcing only one or two hills away from the Dniester but falling into the river Prut, a tributary of Danube. The SE part of the Dniester Hills is characterized by creeks falling into the river Răut, which itself afterwards falls into the Dniester.

Plateaus of Moldova
Plateaus of Ukraine
Geography of Chernivtsi Oblast